Dimas Galih Gumilang (born 15 November 1991) is an Indonesian professional footballer who plays as a forward for Liga 2 club Kalteng Putra.

Club career

Persik Kediri 
He scored his first goal for Persik in a 1–2 loss against Semen Padang.

PSGC Ciamis 
In January 2015, he signed with PSGC.

Honours

Individual
 Indonesia Super League U-21 Top Goalscorer: 2012 (Shared)

References

External links 
 
 Dimas Galih Gumilang at Liga Indonesia

1991 births
Living people
Indonesian footballers
Liga 1 (Indonesia) players
Persik Kediri players
Indonesian Premier Division players
Sportspeople from Surabaya
Association football forwards